This article is the discography of English-Australian singer Leo Sayer.

Albums

Studio albums

Live albums

Soundtrack albums

Compilation albums

Video albums

Box sets

Repackaged sets

Singles

Notes

References 

Discographies of British artists
Discographies of Australian artists
Pop music discographies
Rock music discographies
Disco discographies